Nimitala is a place at Mollarpur town, near Fatepur, Birbhum district, West Bengal, India.

Demographics
Here a shivalinga . Here a "smasan" i.e. burning place and a grand field is situated. A grand fair is held every year from shivaratri.

The name "Nimitala" come from  'Nirmalakseswara' shiva. Here the central temple is of Sri Sri Ramkrishna and Maa Sharada.

Amba
Amba village is a village ( now ward / para) of Mollarpur. Amba is a mouza also. Here a primary school, an anganwari centre at Amba. It is Mollarpur III/XII.

References

Villages in Birbhum district